Macropus ferragus is an extinct species of kangaroo that lived in Australia during the Late Pleistocene.

Description
Macropus ferragus was a large species of kangaroo.

Fossils have mostly been found in the state of New South Wales. It lived until around 30,000 years ago. Fossils found at Lake Menindee in New South Wales potentially date to as recently as 18,000 BP.

References

Prehistoric macropods
Pleistocene mammals of Australia
Pleistocene marsupials
Pleistocene extinctions